The 2010–11 Danish 1st Division season was the 15th season of the Danish 1st Division league championship, governed by the Danish Football Association. It is set to start on 6 August 2010 with the recently relegated HB Køge facing off against last season's eighth-place finisher FC Fyn. The final matches of the season are scheduled for 29 May 2011.

This will be the last season with a sixteen-club First Division. As only one team will be promoted from the Second Divisions, the league will be reduced to fourteen teams from the next season and eventually to twelve teams in the following season (2012–13), switching to the same system as the Superliga with three round-robin rounds and two relegation spots.

On March 4, 2011 Vejle BK and Kolding FC's application for a cooperation forming Vejle Boldklub Kolding was accepted by the Danish FA. This means that the company behind Kolding FC will fold and the club's license will revert to Kolding IF, who will be relegated to the Denmark Series.

The division-champion and runners-up are promoted to the 2011–12 Danish Superliga. The teams in the 14th, 15th and 16th places are relegated to either 2nd Division East or West, based on their respective locations. No matter what position Kolding FC finishes in, they will be relegated to the Denmark Series.

Participants

League table

Managerial changes

See also
2010-11 in Danish football

References

External links
  Danish FA

Danish 1st Division seasons
Denmark
2010–11 in Danish football